Dan Buckner (born May 31, 1990) is an American football wide receiver who is currently a free agent. He played college football at the University of Arizona, and before that for the University of Texas at Austin where he played in the 2010 BCS National Championship Game. Buckner has also been a member of the Arizona Cardinals, Tampa Bay Buccaneers and the Ottawa Redblacks

Professional career

Arizona Cardinals
On April 27, 2013, he signed with the Arizona Cardinals as an undrafted free agent following the 2013 NFL Draft. He was released on September 21, 2013.

Tampa Bay Buccaneers
On September 24, 2013, he was signed to the Tampa Bay Buccaneers' practice squad.

Ottawa Redblacks
Buckner signed with the Ottawa Redblacks on October 7, 2014. Buckner dressed for 2 games with the RedBlacks, but did not catch any passes.

Calgary Stampeders 
On January 15, 2015, the Ottawa RedBlacks traded LB Jasper Simmons and Dan Buckner to the Stampeders in exchange for WR Maurice Price.

Arizona Rattlers 
On July 8, 2015, Buckner was assigned to the Arizona Rattlers of the Arena Football League.

Los Angeles KISS 
On April 14, 2016, Buckner was assigned to the Los Angeles KISS. On May 24, 2016, Buckner was placed on recallable reassignment.

Arizona Rattlers
On June 6, 2016, Buckner was assigned to the Rattlers.

References

External links
 Just Sports Stats
 Arizona Wildcats bio
 Arizona Cardinals bio
 Ottawa RedBlacks bio
 Calgary Stampeders bio

Living people
American football wide receivers
Canadian football wide receivers
African-American players of American football
African-American players of Canadian football
Arizona Cardinals players
Tampa Bay Buccaneers players
1990 births
People from Allen, Texas
Players of American football from Texas
Arizona Wildcats football players
Texas Longhorns football players
Arizona Rattlers players
Ottawa Redblacks players
Calgary Stampeders players
Los Angeles Kiss players